Brdarci is a small settlement east of Dragatuš in the Municipality of Črnomelj in the White Carniola area of southeastern Slovenia. The area is part of the traditional region of Lower Carniola and is now included in the Southeast Slovenia Statistical Region.

Name
Brdarci was attested in written sources as Wardarecz in 1463 and Wärarecz in 1464.

References

External links
Brdarci on Geopedia

Populated places in the Municipality of Črnomelj